Fresh Meadow Pond is a  pond in the East Carver section of Carver and Plymouth, Massachusetts, United States. An unnamed  island lies in the middle of the pond. Pinewood Lodge Campground occupies, in the Plymouth portion, both the northeastern portion of the pond and the island.

External links
Environment Protection Agency
Pinewood Lodge Campground

Ponds of Plymouth, Massachusetts
Ponds of Massachusetts